The following is a partial list that includes graduates, professors, administrators and other notable people associated with the University of Massachusetts Lowell (UMass Lowell).

Alumni

Art, Entertainment and music

Business

Education

Media and writing

Military

Politics

Science

Sports

Hockey

Other

Other

Faculty

Greeley Peace Scholars

References 

University of Massachusetts
University of Massachusetts Lowell alumni
University of Massachusetts Lowell people
University of Massachusetts Lowell faculty
Chancellors of the University of Massachusetts Lowell
University of Massachusetts